Parasphallenum fulguratum is a species of beetle in the family Cerambycidae, the only species in the genus Parasphallenum.

References

Cerambycini